The Dog House may refer to:
Doghouse, a small shed commonly built in the shape of a little house intended for a dog
The Dog House (TV series), a 2019 UK observational documentary television series
Dog House (TV series), a Canadian comedy television series broadcast in the 1990–91 season
The Dog House (film), a 1952 Tom and Jerry short
The Dog House (talk show), a program that has been on the air in San Francisco, New York & Las Vegas
Oil well dog house, a general-purpose shelter adjacent to the rig floor, during drilling activities
Dog House radar, the NATO name for the Russian Dunay-3M radar

See also
 Doghouse (disambiguation)
In the Doghouse (disambiguation)